is a Japanese light novel series, written by Bokuto Uno and illustrated by Sanbasō (volumes 1–5) and Ryūtetsu (volume 6–14) between 2012 and 2018. A manga based on the series, written by Taiki Kawakami, is published in Dengeki Daioh. An anime adaptation produced by Madhouse and directed by Tetsuo Ichimura aired from July 9 to September 30, 2016.

Summary
The Katvarna Empire is at war with the neighboring Republic of Kioka. In the Katvarna Empire, the lazy, woman-admiring Ikuta hates war, but due to certain circumstances, he grudgingly takes the High Grade Military Officer Exam. No one would have expected that this 17-year-old young man would eventually become a soldier called a great commander by others. Ikuta survives this world engulfed in war with his superior intellect.

Characters

Spirit: Light Spirit Kus 
 Even though Ikta is an extremely intelligent war strategist, he abhors war and despises being assigned as a soldier, due to what happened to his father Bada Sankrei. He is quite frank and has no trouble voicing his opinions (which are usually pessimistic but truthful), however aggravating it may be. Slothful by nature, he has a habit of ending battles in the most convenient way possible. He enjoys chasing after older women, primarily Haroma, and hates handsome men. After being made an Imperial Knight for his part in the rescue of Princess Chamille, Ikta said he has now become the three things he never wanted to be: a soldier, a noble and a hero.

Spirit: Flame Spirit Shia 
 The Igsem family was given the duty and the honor to wear two swords to protect the Kingdom. Yatorishino is the latest of this family and possibly the best having been trained since she was a little girl. Due to a deal made between her and Ikta, both have become companions since their academy days. She has bright red hair. She wields a saber and a main gauche when fighting, though she uses the parrying dagger in a much more offensive style. She is extremely loyal to the Kingdom and will immediately attack Ikta should he overstep his bounds while complaining about the kingdom to a higher up. At one time when she attacked a group of men that tried to kidnap Princess Chamille, she was in such a blood rage that after it was over, Ikta had to talk her down to finally get her to drop her swords.

Third princess of the imperial family. She joins Ikta's group after he rescues her from drowning. She understands how intelligent Ikta is and how he hides it with his laziness. She holds him in high regard, not just for his intelligence but for his outspoken personality as well, something many lack. She hates how the country is in the latter part of its decline and she wants to destroy it, so it can start over again. She enlists Ikta's help for this as all the others either lack the intelligence, like Torway or Matthew, or are too loyal to the country to destroy it even if it's for the better, like Yatorishino.

Spirit: Wind Spirit Safi
The Remion family is known for having some of the best marksmen in the Kingdom. An academy graduate who meets Ikta and the others on the ship before the High Officers exam. He is revealed to be extremely proficient with guns, and can easily hit a target from afar. However he cannot hit a close up target as he cannot view them objectively. Ikta suggests that he pick off the enemy from far as possible so that he cannot see them clearly enough to view them as human, which works very well. Torway loves to nickname people, usually his male friends, even though Ikta is really against it. He uses an air spirit.

Spirit: Wind Spirit Tsuu
Ikta's and Yatorishino's classmate in the academy. The three meet each other again in the ship heading for the army exam. His family, Tetdrich, is part of a minor noble family that has a low recognition. He desires to make his family better known. Since Yatorishino and Torway are part of more recognized noble families he sees them as great rivals and often compares himself to them, hoping to beat them one day. He often engages in chess games with all the characters in an attempt to improve his ability of thinking strategically.

Spirit: Water Spirit Miru
A nurse who meets Ikta and the others on the ship before their army exam. She is considered very beautiful by Ikta who often flirts with her, which leaves her flustered. She has five younger brothers as stated by her, whom she wants to take care of. She wants to be a nurse in the army, and often takes care of the group.

Media

Light novels
Bokuto Uno began publishing the light novels with illustrations by Sanbasō under ASCII Media Works' Dengeki Bunko imprint in June 2012. After Sanbasō began suffering from poor health, Ryūtetsu took over illustrating the series, starting with the sixth novel.

Manga
A manga adaptation by Taiki Kawakami began serialization in the July 2014 issue of ASCII Media Works imprint Dengeki Comics' seinen manga magazine Dengeki Maoh on May 27, 2014.

Anime
An anime adaptation was announced at the Dengeki Bunko Autumn Festival 2015 on October 4, 2015. The adaptation was later revealed to be a television series in the December issue of Kodansha's Monthly Shōnen Sirius magazine on October 26, 2015. A trailer for the series was released during the Dengeki Bunko Haru no Saiten 2016 event on March 13, 2016.

The series is directed by Tetsuo Ichimura and written by Shogo Yasukawa, with animation by the studio Madhouse. Kunio Katsuki provided the character designs for the anime, while Yoshikazu Iwanami served as the series' sound director. Keiji Inai composed the music for the anime.

The series aired from July 9, 2016 to September 30, 2016 on Tokyo MX. It then aired on KBS Kyoto, Sun TV, TV Aichi, and BS Fuji on July 11, and on AT-X on July 12. Crunchyroll simulcast the series on their website. The anime was released across seven Blu-ray & DVD volumes. The anime is licensed in North America by Crunchyroll and distributed by Funimation, who provided an English dub of the series. FUnimation later premiered with its English dub in December 2016.

Episode list

Reception
In 2014, the light novels ranked at number ten on the Kono Light Novel ga Sugoi! list of top 10 light novels.

The anime series has received generally positive reviews.

See also
That Time I Got Reincarnated as a Slime - Another light novel whose manga adaptation was illustrated by Taiki Kawakami

Notes

References

External links
  
  
  
 

2012 Japanese novels
Anime and manga based on light novels
ASCII Media Works manga
Crunchyroll anime
Kadokawa Dwango franchises
Dengeki Bunko
Dengeki Comics
Fantasy anime and manga
Funimation
Light novels
Madhouse (company)
Seinen manga
Tokyo MX original programming